The following is a list of investments and acquisitions made by Japanese electronic commerce and online retailing company Rakuten.

Acquisitions

Investments

References

External links 
 Rakuten.com corporate history

Lists of corporate mergers and acquisitions
Rakuten